Fiji Fashion Week (FJFW) is run by Fashion Week (Fiji) Limited (FWL) a limited liability company incorporated in the Republic of Fiji in January, 2009.

History
Fiji’s first ever Fashion Week was between the 4 to 6 December 2008 at the Hilton Hotel in Denarau. Fiji Fashion Week was founded by Donna Whippy.  It is now currently run and managed by television presenter journalist and socialite Ellen Whippy-Knight. Knight took over from Ms Donna in 2009 and currently still manages FJFW 14 years on..

The 2009 event was then held between 3–6 December at Albert Park in Suva.

External links
 

Fashion events in Fiji
Recurring events established in 2008
2008 establishments in Fiji
Fashion weeks